Comptche (Pomo: Compatche, meaning "In the valley among the hills") is an unincorporated community and census-designated place (CDP) in Mendocino County, California, United States. There is a K–3 primary school serving the town, as well as a small store with gas pump; a post office, and a church. The population was 167 at the 2020 census.

Geography
Comptche is located in west-central Mendocino County at  (39.2648954, -123.5911224). It is in ZIP code 95427 and lies at the junction of three minor roads. Comptche–Ukiah Road extends west from Comptche  to Mendocino on State Route 1, while to the east Orr Springs Road leads  to Ukiah on U.S. 101 (passing through Montgomery Woods State Natural Reserve approximately halfway to Ukiah). Flynn Creek Road leads southward from Comptche  to State Route 128 in Navarro River Redwoods State Park, near the town of Navarro. Flynn Creek Road and the western segment of Comptche–Ukiah Road provide an alternative route between Mendocino and the Anderson Valley, used in winter storms when the Navarro River floods Route 128.

The Albion River runs along the southern edge of the community, flowing west to the Pacific Ocean at Albion.

History
The Comptche post office opened in 1877, closed later that same year, and reopened in 1879. Although the precise origin of the town's name is unknown, there was a village of the Pomo people named Komacho nearby.

CDP demographics

At the 2010 census the Comptche CDP had a population of 159. The racial makeup of Comptche was 146 (91.8%) White, 0 (0.0%) African American, 1 (0.6%) Native American, 1 (0.6%) Asian, 0 (0.0%) Pacific Islander, 5 (3.1%) from other races, and 6 (3.8%) from two or more races. Hispanic or Latino of any race were 10 people (6.3%).

The whole population lived in households; no one lived in non-institutionalized group quarters and no one was institutionalized.

There were 67 households, of which 18 (26.9%) had children under the age of 18 living in them, 25 (37.3%) were opposite-sex married couples living together, 9 (13.4%) had a female householder with no husband present, 5 (7.5%) had a male householder with no wife present.  There were 6 (9.0%) unmarried opposite-sex partnerships, and 0 (0%) same-sex married couples or partnerships. 19 households (28.4%) were one person and 6 (9.0%) had someone living alone who was 65 or older. The average household size was 2.37.  There were 39 families (58.2% of households); the average family size was 2.90.

The age distribution was 35 people (22.0%) under the age of 18, 9 people (5.7%) aged 18 to 24, 34 people (21.4%) aged 25 to 44, 59 people (37.1%) aged 45 to 64, and 22 people (13.8%) who were 65 or older.  The median age was 47.3 years. For every 100 females, there were 127.1 males.  For every 100 females age 18 and over, there were 110.2 males.

There were 83 housing units at an average density of 72.0 per square mile; of the occupied units, 39 (58.2%) were owner-occupied and 28 (41.8%) were rented. The homeowner vacancy rate was 0%; the rental vacancy rate was 9.7%.  86 people (54.1% of the population) lived in owner-occupied housing units and 73 people (45.9%) lived in rental housing units.

Politics

References

 

Census-designated places in Mendocino County, California
Census-designated places in California